The men's 110 metres hurdles event at the 1981 Summer Universiade was held at the Stadionul Naţional in Bucharest on 21, 22 and 23 July 1981.

Medalists

Results

Heats
Wind:Heat 1: -2.1 m/s, Heat 2: +1.6 m/s, Heat 3: -1.1 m/s, Heat 4: +1.7 m/s

Semifinals
Wind:Heat 1: +1.5 m/s, Heat 2: +0.7 m/s

Final

Wind: +1.0 m/s

References

Athletics at the 1981 Summer Universiade
1981